Michael Letterlough (born 26 September 1984) is a Caymanian track and field athlete competing in the hammer throw.  After graduating from John Gray High School on Grand Cayman, Letterlough attended Florida International University in Miami and currently trains under the guidance of Anatoliy Bondarchuk in Kamloops, British Columbia.

During the course of his athletic career at Florida International, Letterlough won the 2006 Sun Belt Conference championship, set school records in the hammer throw and weight throw and was named Sun Belt Conference athlete of the week.  During this time, he also set Cayman national records in the hammer throw, discus throw, and weight throw and served as the captain for the Cayman Islands team at the 2005 Island Games.

Letterlough graduated from Florida International with a finance degree in 2006, but remained in Florida to continue training and improved his national record in the hammer throw to 58.10 meters in 2007. Later that season, he also represented the Cayman Islands at the Pan American Games.  Letterlough then moved north at the end of 2007 to join Bondarchuk's training group in Canada. Since the move, he has steadily increased his national record. He most recently improved the record of 62.54m on 5 June 2011 in Kamloops, British Columbia, Canada. Letterlough also continues to represent the Cayman Islands in international championships and won his fourth Island Games silver medal in 2011.

Major Competition Results 
2011 Island Games - silver medal
2010 Commonwealth Games - thirteenth place
2010 Central American and Caribbean Games - eight place
2009 Island Games - silver medal
2009 Central American and Caribbean Championships - tenth place
2008 Central American and Caribbean Championships - sixth place
2007 Island Games - silver medal
2007 NACAC Championships - fourth place
2007 Pan American Games - thirteenth place
2006 Central American and Caribbean Games - ninth place
2006 Commonwealth Games - thirteenth place
2005 Island Games - silver medal

References

External links
 
 Official Blog

1984 births
Male hammer throwers
Caymanian hammer throwers
Florida International University alumni
Athletes (track and field) at the 2006 Commonwealth Games
Athletes (track and field) at the 2010 Commonwealth Games
Athletes (track and field) at the 2007 Pan American Games
Commonwealth Games competitors for the Cayman Islands
Pan American Games competitors for the Cayman Islands
Living people
Caymanian male athletes